The Naggers was a series of 18 film short films produced by Warner Brothers at the Vitaphone studio in Brooklyn, New York. These featured Jack Norworth and Dorothy Adelphi as an arguing husband and wife in a variety of domestic settings. This basic premise predated the popular radio series The Bickersons and many future TV marital comedies.

Overview

Often listed in the trade magazines as either part of the Vitaphone Varieties or “Pepper Pots”, these black and white comedies averaged 7 to 10 minutes in length. 

Jack Norworth was a songwriter and ex-husband of the famous Nora Bayes, both subjects of a later Warner feature, Shine On, Harvest Moon (1944). He teamed with his then-wife Dorothy Adelphi in a pilot film, Odds and Ends, released in May 1929 as part of the Vitaphone Varieties. Norworth also had appeared in a few other films for Warner-Vitaphone, starting with 1928’s Songs and Things.

The little Nagger comedies were played before the main features in 1930-1932, along with the latest Looney Tune or other accompanying Vitaphone short subject, and were generally well received by the critics (writing in Film Daily and other periodicals). Today, much of the humor may seem a bit milder to viewers. A few have been shown on Turner Classic Movies.

List of titles (with director and release or review dates)

The Naggers / Roy Mack (director) / June 1, 1930 (Film Daily review)
The Naggers at Breakfast / September 5, 1930
The Naggers Go South / December 28, 1930 / two-reeler (18 minutes)
The Naggers Go Rooting / January 4, 1931
The Naggers' Day of Rest / Alfred J. Goulding (director) / © January 5, 1931
The Naggers Go Camping / Alfred J. Goulding (director) / © February 20, 1931
The Naggers at the Dentist / Arthur Hurley (director) / © March 16, 1931
The Naggers Go Shopping / Al Ray (director) / May 1931
The Naggers at the Ringside / Alfred J. Goulding (director) / May 11, 1931 (Film Daily review)
The Naggers in the Subway / Alfred J. Goulding (director) / June 21, 1931 (Film Daily review)
The Naggers' Housewarming / Alfred J. Goulding (director) / July 1931
The Naggers at the Races / Alfred J. Goulding (director) / August 9, 1931 (Film Daily review)
The Naggers' Anniversary / Alfred J. Goulding (director) / September 1931
The Naggers at the Opera / Alfred J. Goulding (director) / February 7, 1932 (Film Daily review)
The Naggers: Spreading Sunshine / Alfred J. Goulding (director) / April 3, 1932 (Film Daily review)
The Naggers: Movie Dumb / Alfred J. Goulding (director); with Donna Broome, Frank McNellis, Granville Bates & Irene Alberg as supporting cast / May 1, 1932 (Film Daily review)
The Naggers Go Ritzy / Roy Mack (director); with Robert Hyman & Donna Broome / May 22, 1932 (Film Daily review)
The Naggers on Four Wheels- No Brakes / Alfred J. Goulding (director); with Barton MacLane, Ed Gragan & Flavia Arcaro as supporting cast / June 11, 1932

See also
Jack Norworth
Vitaphone Varieties
List of short subjects by Hollywood studio#Warner Brothers

Links
Film Daily links (specific article dates listed above, under the “short subject review” pages)
Dorothy Adelphi titles on IMDb.com
Naggers titles on Complete Index To World Film

References
 
 Motion Pictures 1912-1939 Catalog of Copyright Entries 1951 Library of Congress

Notes

Vitaphone short films
Warner Bros. short films